Terror is Our Business: Dana Roberts' Casebook of Horrors is a collection of short stories written by American authors Joe R. Lansdale and Kasey Lansdale. It chronicles the stories of Dana Roberts, an investigator of paranormal activities. This is one of several times Joe and daughter Kasey have written about their heroine. This collection was published by Cutting Block Books as a trade paperback.

Table of contents
Introduction: Dana Roberts, Her Kith and Kin
The Case of the Lighthouse Shambler
The Case of the Stalking Shadow 
The Case of the Four Acre Haunt 
The Case of the Angry Traveler 
Introduction: Jana and Dana
Blind Love 
The Case of the Bleeding Wall 
The Case of the Ragman's Anguish

References

External links
 Joe R. Lansdale's Official Website
 Kasey Lansdale's Official Website
 Publisher's Website

Short story collections by Joe R. Lansdale
Works by Joe R. Lansdale
2018 short story collections
Horror short story collections